Çarxı (also, Charkhi, Charkhy, and Charkhy Khyrdaoymakh) is a village and municipality in the Khachmaz Rayon of Azerbaijan.  It has a population of 2,900.

References 

Populated places in Khachmaz District